Kunkush Punta (Ancash Quechua kunkush Puya raimondii, punta peak; ridge; first, before, in front of, Hispanicized spelling Cuncushpunta) is a  mountain in the southern part of the Cordillera Blanca in the Andes of Peru. It is situated in the Ancash Region, Recuay Province, Catac District. Kunkush Punta lies east of Qiruqucha.

Sources 

Mountains of Peru
Mountains of Ancash Region